Athletics competitions at the 2015 Pan American Games in Toronto were held from July 19 to 26 at the newly built CIBC Pan Am and Parapan Am Athletics Stadium, located on the campus of York University. The racewalking and marathon events were held on the temporary circuits around the Ontario Place West Channel. The sport of athletics is split into distinct sets of events: track and field events, road running events, and racewalking events.

Mirroring the Olympic athletics program, both men and women had very similar schedules of events. Men competed in 24 events and women in 23, as their schedule lacks the 50 km race walk. In addition, both the men's 110 m hurdles and decathlon are reflected in the women's schedule by the 100 m hurdles and heptathlon, respectively.

Competition schedule

The following is the competition schedule for the athletics competitions:

Medal table

Medalists

Men's events

Women's events

Participating nations

All 41 participating countries have qualified athletes. The number of athletes a nation has entered is in parentheses beside the name of the country.

Qualification

A total of 680 athletes will qualify to compete at the games. A nation may enter a maximum of two athletes per event, granted they meet the qualification standard. Qualification times and standards can be set from January 1, 2014 to June 28, 2015. The winner of each event contested at the 2014 Pan American Sports Festival will also qualify. Furthermore, a total of sixteen relay teams per event will qualify as well.

See also
2015 World Championships in Athletics
Athletics at the 2016 Summer Olympics

References

 
Athletics
2015
Pan American Games
International track and field competitions hosted by Canada